The top 4 ranked teams of 2009 will compete in a "Super Cup" competition starting on the 22nd of December. The four teams will form a group and play matches in the Suphachalasai Stadium. The champion of the competition will receive 1,500,000 baht.

2009 Participants
 Muangthong United : 2009 Thai Premier League Champion
 Chonburi : 2009 Thai Premier League Runner Up
 Bangkok Glass : 2009 Thai Premier League 3rd Place
 BEC Tero Sasana : 2009 Thai Premier League 4th Place

Prize money 
 Champion     : 600,000 Baht
 Runner-up    : 400,000 Baht
 Third Place  : 300,000 Baht
 Fourth Place : 200,000 Baht

Standings

Results

Annual awards
Goalkeeper of the Tournament
  Kritsana Klanklin - Bangkok Glass

Defender of the Tournament
  Cholratit Jantakam - Chonburi

Midfielder of the Tournament
  Hironori Saruta - Bangkok Glass

Striker of the Tournament
  Wuttichai Tathong - BEC Tero Sasana

3
2009